Placilla was a four-masted barque which was built for F. Laeisz, Hamburg, Germany in 1892. She was sold in 1901 and renamed Optima in 1903. In 1905 she was wrecked on the Haisborough Sands.

Description
Placilla was built by Joh. C. Tecklenborg in Geestemünde, Germany. She had four masts and was rigged as a barque, with royal sails over double top and topgallant sails. Placilla was a sister ship to Pisagua, which was launched seven months later than she was.

History
Placilla entered service with F Laeisz, Hamburg in 1892. She was used on the route between Germany and Chile. In 1892, Placilla made the voyage from Lizard Point to Valparaiso, Chile in 58 days. This was a record time. It was equalled by Potosi (1900), Pitlochry (1902), Preußen (1903), Eldora (1904) and Preußen (1905). She recorded a fastest voyage from Iquique, Chile to the English Channel of 71 days and a voyage from Pisagua, Chile to The Lizard in 78 days. In 1901 she was sold to Rhederei AG von 1896, Hamburg. She was renamed Optima in 1903. On 6 January 1905, she departed Hamburg bound for Santa Rosalía, Mexico with a cargo of coke. On 18 January 1905, she ran aground on the misty Haisborough Sands after a storm in the North Sea, off the coast of Norfolk and was wrecked. All of the crew survived.

Captains
The captains of Pisagua were:-
 Robert Hilgendorf (1892–94)
 Otto Schmidt (1894-1901)
 Fr. Wilhelm Thöm (1901–1903)
 H. Butz (1903–1905)

Code Letters
Placilla was assigned the Code Letters RJLM.

References

External links
 Photo of Placilla

1892 ships
Ships built in Hamburg
Barques
Merchant ships of the German Empire
Tall ships of the German Empire
Maritime incidents in 1905
Ships sunk with no fatalities
Shipwrecks in the North Sea